Eugen Fraenkel (born 28 September 1853 in Neustadt i. OS, now Prudnik, Poland; died in Hamburg, Germany on 20 December 1925) was a German bacteriologist.

Eugen Fraenkel worked as pathologist and bacteriologist researcher  at the Eppendorf Hospital (Eppendorfer Krankenhaus) where he discovered the gas gangrene bacillus (Bacillus fraenkeli, later renamed Clostridium perfringens). He served in the German military during World War I.

Eugen Fraenkel was married to Marie Fraenkel (née Deutsch, 1861–1944) with whom he had three children: Max Fraenkel (1882–1938), Hans Fraenkel (1888–1971), and Margarete Kuttner née Fraenkel (1884–1944). Hans left Germany to work as an economist and journalist in Switzerland, his descendants living in Switzerland and Italy. Max, a physician in Hamburg, committed suicide under pressure of antisemitic chicanery. Marie perished in the Theresienstadt concentration camp, and Margarete, who had moved to Berlin, during the last gassing at Auschwitz-Birkenau concentration camp in November 1944.

Works
 Ueber Nierenveränderungen nach Schwefelsäurevergiftung . [S.l.], 1893 Digital edition by the University and State Library Düsseldorf

Sources
 Personal communication from Paul Kuttner, New York City, USA, son of Margarete Fraenkel née Kuttner
 Carl Crauspe: Fraenkel, Eugen in Neue Deutsche Biographie Bd.: 5, Berlin, 1961
 Paul Kuttner, An Endless Struggle : Reminiscences and Reflections, Vantage Press, 2009

External links
 Fraenkel,  Eugen 
 Brief introduction to the Fraenkel family
  Fraenkel · Frau Professor Fraenkel
 

1853 births
1925 deaths
German bacteriologists
19th-century German Jews
Academic staff of the University of Hamburg
People from Prudnik